Reefing reduces the area of a sail, usually by folding or rolling one edge of the canvas in on itself and attaching the unused portion to a spar or a stay, as the primary measure to preserve a sailing vessel's stability in strong winds. Restoring full sail area is termed shaking out a reef. 

Whereas fore-and-aft rigged vessels store the unused portion of the sail on a boom, below the sail, square-rigged vessels stow the unused portion on a spar, above the sail. Reefing may occur by rolling the sail around its luff or foot, either on a rotating stay or within a spar.

Fore-and-aft rigs 

Sails may have built-in alternative attachment points that allow their area to be reduced. In a mainsail, pairs of grommets, called reefing tacks, reefing clews, or reefing cringles may be installed in the sail; a cruising boat will typically have two to three pairs. Pulling these points down to the boom forms a new tack and clew, reducing the sail's area. Using the pair of grommets closest to the boom is called a single reef, using the next pair is called a double reef, and so on. A sail may have reef points, grommeted holes in the sail between the reefing tacks. These are used with reefing lines or  buntlines to secure the excess fabric of the sail after reefing to minimize flogging and improve visibility from the cockpit.

Slab 
Slab or jiffy reefing allows for the quick establishment of a new tack and clew, while the halyard is partially lowered and then raised. One or two reefing lines passing through the sail's luff and leach reef cringles create a new tack and clew for the sail by pulling those points tight to the boom. These can be led back to the cockpit to allow crew members to reef without going on deck in heavy weather. Intermediate reef cringles need not be used.

Roller 
Roller reefing rolls or wraps the sail around a wire, foil, or spar to reduce its exposure to the wind. In mainsail furling systems the sail is either wrapped around the boom by a mechanism in the gooseneck or hardware inside the boom winds it around a rotating foil. Furling systems controlled with lines led to the cockpit allow reefing without crew having to go on deck in heavy weather. Roller reefing also allows more variable sail area than conventional or jiffy reefing. Countering these advantages are the furled sail possibly not having an optimal shape and sail repair or replacement being more difficult. In-mast roller-furling mainsails are not conducive to good sail shape.

Square rigs 

Square-rigged sails hang from a spar, called a yard. When reefed, the sail is pulled upwards and affixed to the yard at one of the reef bands that runs horizontally across the sail. Each reef band is a canvas-reinforced strip, which contains cringles—eyes through which the reef lines pass that attach the sail to the yard. A sail may have several reef bands to shorten sail to different degrees.

See also
Brail
Glossary of nautical terms (M-Z)

References

Sailing manoeuvres